The Doherty Slide is a prominent dissected rim of volcanic origin located in southeastern Oregon in the United States. It is located in rural Lake County, just north of the Nevada border. The ridge sits at the eastern end of the Guano Valley, approximately 20 miles (32 km) east of the town of Adel.

The ridge was formed by lava extrusions and has been subsequently eroded to produce the present rim. The term "slide" likely refers to the large amount of eroded material along the base of the ridge, which rises approximately 1000 ft (300 m) from the valley floor on the western side. The eastern side is a plateau that stretches eastward through southeastern Oregon. Oregon Route 140 climbs the face of the slide.

External links
Doherty hang glide launch site - Bureau of Land Management

Bureau of Land Management areas in Oregon
Landforms of Lake County, Oregon
Protected areas of Lake County, Oregon
Volcanoes of Oregon